Daniel J. Tamburello is a Republican Party politician who served in the New Hampshire House of Representatives from 2010 to 2016, where he represented the Rockingham 5 district.

A resident of Londonderry, New Hampshire, Tamburello grew up in Morris County, New Jersey, where he attended West Morris Mendham High School.

Tamburello was awarded an undergraduate degree from Liberty University and received a masters from Johns Hopkins University. He served in the United States Marine Corps.

References

Living people
Year of birth missing (living people)
Johns Hopkins University alumni
Liberty University alumni
Republican Party members of the New Hampshire House of Representatives
People from Londonderry, New Hampshire
People from Morris County, New Jersey
West Morris Mendham High School alumni